Carlos Martín Jiménez Macías (born 1 May 1950) is a Mexican politician affiliated with the PRI. As of 2013 he served as Senator of the LX and LXI Legislatures of the Mexican Congress representing San Luis Potosí. He also served as Deputy in the LVII and LIX Legislatures.

Since March 2013 he serves as Mexican Consul in Chicago.

References

1950 births
Living people
Members of the Senate of the Republic (Mexico)
Members of the Chamber of Deputies (Mexico)
Institutional Revolutionary Party politicians
20th-century Mexican politicians
21st-century Mexican politicians
People from San Luis Potosí City
Politicians from San Luis Potosí
Universidad Autónoma de San Luis Potosí alumni